Zlatko Ugljen (born 13 September 1929) is a Bosnian architect. He was born in Mostar in 1929. His work includes economic buildings, private housing, memorials, religious buildings, and cultural institutions. A significant part of his oeuvre consists of Islamic and Catholic sacred buildings. Among his most famous sacred buildings is the White Mosque in Visoko, for which he received the Aga Khan Award for Architecture in 1983.

Awards
 The April 6th City of Sarajevo Award, 1963
 Federal awards "Borba" for architecture, 1978
 Aga Khan Award for Architecture, 1983
 Bosnia and Herzegovina July 27 Awards, 1983
 Sarajevo Society of Architects Award, 1980
 Award of the Association of Applied Artists of Bosnia and Herzegovina, 1963

References

Living people
Bosnia and Herzegovina architects
People from Mostar
1929 births